Leonard Frank Spath FRS (20 October 1882 – 2 March 1957) was a British geologist specialising in malacology and ammonitology.

Education
Spath gained a Bachelor of Science degree in geology at Birkbeck College in 1912 and obtained employment at the British Museum as an assistant curator in the geology department. He undertook two geology field trips, to Tunisia and Newfoundland, around that time which he used as an opportunity to collect fossils. He later gained a Doctor of Science degree from the University of London and was a lecturer in Geology at Birkbeck, University of London.

Awards and honours
Spath was elected a Fellow of the Royal Society (FRS) in 1940, his certificate of election reads: 

Spath won the prestigious annual scientific Lyell Medal given by the Geological Society of London in 1945.

References

Spath, Leonard Frank
Spath, Leonard Frank
Alumni of the University of London
Spath, Leonard Frank
Spath, Leonard Frank
Fellows of the Royal Society
Lyell Medal winners
20th-century British zoologists